The 2013 Sprint Unlimited at Daytona was a NASCAR Sprint Cup Series stock car race that was held on February 16, 2013, at Daytona International Speedway in Daytona Beach, Florida. Contested over 75 laps, it was the first exhibition race of the 2013 Sprint Cup Series season. Kevin Harvick of Richard Childress Racing won the race, while Greg Biffle finished second. Joey Logano, Tony Stewart, and Matt Kenseth rounded out the top five.

Report

Background

The track, Daytona International Speedway, is one of  six  superspeedways to hold NASCAR races, the others being Michigan International Speedway, Auto Club Speedway, Indianapolis Motor Speedway, Pocono Raceway and Talladega Superspeedway. The track's turns are banked at 31 degrees, while the front stretch, the location of the finish line, is banked at 18 degrees.

A total of twenty-two drivers were eligible to compete in the race, including 2012 pole position winners and previous winners of the race who had qualified for at least one race during the 2012 season, but only nineteen drivers participated in the race. Notable drivers not invited to the race were Brad Keselowski and Clint Bowyer, the 2012 champion and champion runner up, who didn't collect any pole positions in 2012. In yellow are previous Daytona Shootout winners without pole wins in the 2012 season.

Unlike other races, the race format was chosen by a fan poll, and was 75 laps long, with three segments of 30, 25, and 20 laps.

Practice and qualifying
Two practice sessions were held before the race, which was on February 15, 2013. The first session lasted 45 minutes, while the second lasted 60 minutes. Kevin Harvick was quickest with a time of 45.601 seconds in the first session, less than two-hundredths of a second faster than Aric Almirola. Greg Biffle with a quickest time of 45.660 seconds was third, ahead of Kasey Kahne, Martin Truex Jr., and Dale Earnhardt Jr. Juan Pablo Montoya was seventh, still within a second of Harvick's time. Also in the first session, five cars were involved in an accident after Matt Kenseth and Kurt Busch collided. In the second and final practice session, Denny Hamlin was quickest with a fastest time of 45.906 seconds. Joey Logano followed in second, ahead of Biffle and Harvick. Almirola was fifth quickest, with a time of 46.027. Montoya, Kahne, Marcos Ambrose, Kyle Busch, and Terry Labonte rounded out to the first ten positions.

Results

Qualifying

Race results

References

Sprint Unlimited
Sprint Unlimited
Sprint Unlimited
NASCAR races at Daytona International Speedway